
Gmina Miastkowo is a rural gmina (administrative district) in Łomża County, Podlaskie Voivodeship, in north-eastern Poland.

Villages
Gmina Miastkowo contains the villages and settlements of Bartkowizna, Cendrowizna, Czartoria, Drogoszewo, Gałkówka, Kaliszki, Kolonia Nowogrodzka, Korytki Leśne, Kraska, Kuleszka, Leopoldowo, Łubia, Łuby-Kiertany, Łuby-Kurki, Miastkowo, Naruszczki, Nowosiedliny, Orło, Osetno, Podosie, Rybaki, Rydzewo, Rydzewo-Gozdy, Sosnowiec, Sulki, Tarnowo and Zaruzie.

Neighbouring gminas
Gmina Miastkowo is bordered by the gminas of Lelis, Łomża, Nowogród, Rzekuń, Śniadowo, Troszyn and Zbójna.

References

Polish official population figures 2006

Miastkowo
Łomża County